Maria is a Manubaran language spoken in the "Bird's Tail" of Papua New Guinea by approximately 1,350 people in Central Province. It is alternatively known as Gebi and Manubara.

References

External links
 Linguistic map of Papua New Guinea
 Maria Swadesh List by The Rosetta Project at the Internet Archive

Manubaran languages

Languages of Central Province (Papua New Guinea)